Rhamphiophis is a genus of snakes of the family Psammophiidae.

Species
 Rhamphiophis maradiensis Chirio & Ineich, 1991
 Rhamphiophis oxyrhynchus (Reinhardt, 1843)
 Rhamphiophis rostratus Peters, 1854
 Rhamphiophis rubropunctatus (Fischer, 1884)

References

Rhamphiophis
Snake genera
Taxa named by Wilhelm Peters